Baccalà alla vicentina is a Venetian dish native to Vicenza that is made from stockfish (in Italian, stoccafisso), onions, anchovies, milk, and a mature cheese such as Parmesan. It is considered to be one of the signature dishes of Vicenza.

See also
 Italian cuisine
 List of fish dishes

References

External links
Recipes and other information
More
Recipe of the classical Baccalà alla Vicentina

Cuisine of Veneto
Italian seafood dishes